Michael R. Simonson Ph.D. is a professor of Instructional Technology & Distance Education at Nova Southeastern University, Editor of the Quarterly Review of Distance Education and Distance Learning Journal, and author of 4 texts in the area of ITDE.

Biography
Simonson received his doctorate in Education: Instructional Systems Design in 1975 from the University of Iowa after serving for four years in the US Marine Corps as a Captain. He then went on to take a position as Professor of Curriculum and Instruction, Iowa State University from 1982 until 1998. During his time at ISU, Dr. Simonson served as the Associate Director for the Research Institute for Studies in Education from 1991 to 1996. He currently holds the position as the CEO of Technology Research and Evaluation as well has a professor at NSU, editor, and author.

Published works
Simonson has written/co-written four books crystallizing important information in the areas of Instructional Technology & Distance Education, one of which is used as at the graduate level at NSU:
Educational Computing Foundations by Michael R. Simonson, Ann D. Thompson - Education - 1996 - 393 pages
Teaching and Learning at a Distance: Foundations of Distance Education by Michael Simonson, Michael Albright - Education - 2005 - 362 pages
Distance Education: Definition And Glossary of Terms by Lee Ayers Schlosser, Michael R. Simonson - Education - 2006 - 172 pages
Trends and Issues in Distance Education: International Perspectives by Yusra Laila Visser, Lya Visser, Michael Simonson - Education - 2005 - 315 pages

In addition to authoring texts, Dr. Simonson is a published researcher in the area of ITDE. A Google Scholar search of “Michael R. Simonson” returned 85 scholarly articles that he is listed as an author on. Throughout the changing media which Distance Education has been delivered on, Dr. Simonson has continued to investigate the relationship between media,  motivation, attitudes, behaviors, and achievement. His research includes over $3 million in grants funded externally to investigate ITDE and learners relationship to various media.

References

Year of birth missing (living people)
Living people
Iowa State University faculty
University of Iowa alumni
Nova Southeastern University faculty
United States Marine Corps officers